Sered or Sereď may refer to:

Sereď, a town in Slovakia
Sereď concentration camp in Sereď, a Nazi-era labour and transit camp run by the Hlinka Guard
ŠKF Sereď, an association football club
Sered (biblical figure), a minor figure in the Bible